Kapas Station is a railway station located in Kapas, Bojonegoro Regency, East Java. The elevation of this station is +20 metres amsl.

Services
The following is a list of train services at the Kapas Station

Passenger services
 Local economy

References

Bojonegoro Regency
Railway stations in East Java